Division No. 1, Subdivision R is an unorganized subdivision on Bell Island in Newfoundland and Labrador, Canada, in Division 1. It contains the unincorporated communities of Freshwater and Lance Cove.

Newfoundland and Labrador subdivisions